135 may refer to:

135 (number)
AD 135
135 BC
135 film, better known as 35 mm film, is a format of photographic film used for still photography
135 (New Jersey bus)